Turbonilla muelleri is a species of sea snail, a marine gastropod mollusk in the family Pyramidellidae, the pyrams and their allies.

Description
The shell grows to a length of 5 mm.

Distribution
This species occurs in the Atlantic Ocean off Senegal.

References

External links
 To World Register of Marine Species

muelleri
Gastropods described in 1885